José Alejandro Chacopino Luchoro (born 11 May 1988) is a Spanish professional footballer who plays as a forward for Athletic Club Torrellano.

Personal life
Chacopina is of Italian descent.

References

External links

1988 births
Living people
Spanish people of Italian descent
Footballers from Alicante
Spanish footballers
Association football forwards
Segunda División B players
Tercera División players
Tercera Federación players
Divisiones Regionales de Fútbol players
Elche CF Ilicitano footballers
Novelda CF players
Coruxo FC players
Arroyo CP players
UE Sant Andreu footballers
CD San Roque de Lepe footballers
Marbella FC players
FC Jumilla players
CF Badalona players
CD Calahorra players
CF Talavera de la Reina players
Super League Greece players
Athlitiki Enosi Larissa F.C. players
Spanish expatriate footballers
Spanish expatriate sportspeople in Greece
Expatriate footballers in Greece